Łupki  is a village in the administrative district of Gmina Wleń. It is located within Lwówek Śląski County, Lower Silesian Voivodeship, in south-western Poland.

References

Villages in Lwówek Śląski County